Ignacio Agramonte y Loynaz (1841–1873) was a Cuban revolutionary, who played an important part in the Ten Years' War (1868–1878).

Biography
Born in the province of Puerto Príncipe (what is now the province of Camagüey, kingdom of Spain) on December 23, 1841, to a wealthy family. He went to Barcelona, Madrid, and Havana to study law. On June 11, 1865, he graduated as a lawyer.

He returned to Puerto Principe and married Amalia Simoni y Argilagos in August 1868, a woman who was the love of his life and whose family had considerably more wealth than his own.

Agramonte stood tall at 6'2".  He had fine brown hair, pale skin, and was an expert horseman and fencer. He had a fine moustache and not thick or bushy like it appears in many portraits.

When the war of independence against Spain broke out on October 10, 1868, he played a pivotal role in the uprising of Camagüey which took place on November 4, 1868.  Agramonte himself joined the war a week later, on November 11, 1868.

His wife followed him in the struggle, but was captured on May 26, 1870, while pregnant with her second child, who was born in the US and never met his father.

At a conference with other leaders who were trying to make amends with Spain, Agramonte made clear his opinion: "Stop at once all the lobbying, the awkward delays, and the humiliating demands: Cuba's only option is to gain its redemption by tearing itself from Spain through armed force."

In February 1869, he and Antonio Zambrana were elected secretaries, a title equivalent to minister, to the provincial government.  He was subsequently elected a member and one of two secretaries of the Cuban Congress in Arms. He was among the signatories of the act that freed the slaves on the island and was the driving force in the drafting of the first Constitution in Cuban history.

He resigned his secretarial and ministerial position within the Congress after Carlos Manuel de Céspedes was made president that same year because Agramonte had strong political disagreements with him and knew they could not work together.  The Congressional secretaries had to work closely with the president.

He went on to become Major General of the Cuban forces for the military district of the province of Camagüey, where he organized the best cavalry troops in the Cuban Liberation Army. Showing great vision, in spite of his lack of formal military training, his troops terrified the Spanish Army. The Spaniards knew him to be formidable in battle, and nicknamed him "The Young Bolívar".

Agramonte capped his impressive list of military achievements when, on October 8, 1871, he led a daring rescue. His commander, Julio Sanguily, was taken prisoner by more than 120 light cavalry while visiting a farm.  Agramonte ordered 35 of his exhausted troops to mount up and track down the Spaniards. He personally led a furious charge, successfully rescuing Sanguily and routing the enemy troop, killing 11 and taking five prisoners.

Ignacio Agramonte was killed at the Battle of Jimaguayú on May 11, 1873, where he was struck on the head by a stray bullet. The Spanish soldiers stole his wallet and papers. When their officers realized who they had killed, they went back and took the body with them to the provincial capital.  His body was cremated by the Spanish authorities in Camagüey for fear that his troops would assault the city to recover the remnants of his body.

Brigadier General Henry Reeve, an American volunteer and commander of his Cavalry Corps, nicknamed him "El Mayor", implying that Agramonte was the best of all the Cuban Major Generals. Máximo Gómez succeeded him as Chief Military Commander of the military district of the province of Camagüey.

Agramonte used a Colt revolver, Navy model 1851, inlaid with ivory and gold. He used several machetes and sabres, and was carrying a sabre taken from a Spanish colonel at the time of his death.

Legacy

Both the airport and the central park in Camagüey are named after him, and his statue is situated in the civic plaza. The equestrian statue of Agramonte in the park that bears his name was unveiled by his widow Amalia Simoni in 1912; it was the work of an Italian sculptor.

The Cuban village of Agramonte, located in Matanzas Province and part of the municipality of Jagüey Grande, was renamed after him. Its original name was Cuevitas.

His death in battle is the subject of the 1975 song "El Mayor" by Cuban nueva trova singer Silvio Rodríguez.

References

Bibliography
 Carlos Márquez Sterling (1899). Agramonte. El Bayardo de la Revolución Cubana. Introducción de Ignacio Rasco. Miami, Florida: Editorial Cubana (1995 reprint).
 Fermín Peraza y Sarausa La Habana (1943). Ignacio Agramonte y Loynaz, (23/12/1841, 11/5/ 1873). Departamento de Cultura, Colección: Publicaciones de la Biblioteca Municipal de la Habana.
 Empresa Occidental de Geodesia y Cartografía (1989). Atlas biográfico Mayor General Ignacio Agramonte y Loynaz. La Habana: Instituto Cubano de Geodesia y Cartografía.

External links

1841 births
1873 deaths
Cuban politicians
Cuban revolutionaries
People of the Ten Years' War
People from Camagüey
University of Havana alumni